The 2010 AMA Pro Supersport Championship was the second running of the AMA Supersport Championship. Title sponsors for the series include Sunoco, Amsoil, National Guard, Dunlop, Speedcom and SunTrust. Tyler O'Hara became Top Gun champion in a final round shootout, in which the champion was decided through points amassed at Barber Motorsports Park only. Despite not winning a race all season, Austin Dehaven claimed the Young Gun championship.

Calendar

Entry List

See also
 2010 AMA Pro American Superbike Championship
 2010 AMA Pro Daytona Sportbike Championship

References

External links
AMA Pro Racing Championship official site

AMA
AMA Pro Supersport
AMA Supersport Championship